The 2004–05 season saw Ross County compete in the Scottish First Division where they finished in 6th position with 47 points. Ross County reached the 2004 Scottish Challenge Cup Final where they lost 2–1 to Falkirk.

Final league table

Results
Ross County's score comes first

Legend

Scottish First Division

Scottish Cup

Scottish League Cup

Scottish Challenge Cup

Squad statistics

References

External links
 Ross County 2004–05 at Soccerbase.com (select relevant season from dropdown list)

Ross County F.C. seasons
Ross County